Polar Trappers is a 1938 Donald Duck and Goofy cartoon set in the South Pole, where the duo are trapping polar animals (or at least, attempting to). This is the first cartoon where Donald Duck and Goofy appear without Mickey Mouse.

Plot
Goofy is setting up an animal trap while Donald is in an igloo preparing a meal. Donald explains how sick he is of eating beans all the time, and, while noticing a penguin outside, he hatches a plan while thinking of the penguin as roast chicken. The rest of the cartoon deals with him trying to lure a large group of penguins into his pot while Goofy is stuck trying desperately to catch a walrus.

The name of Donald's and Goofy's trapping business is "Donald & Goofy Trapping Co". Their slogan is "We Bring 'Em Back Alive". This is Donald's first time encountering penguins, but it is not his last. The music played while Donald leads the penguins is the instrumental piece "March of the Toys", from the operetta "Babes in Toyland", also known as Parade Of The Tin Soldiers.

When a baby penguin's tear turned into a snowball, after being kicked out of the march angrily by Donald after the small penguin kept on getting in front of him and the fact that Donald doesn't want to cook the small penguin due to its size, the other penguins notice the snowball coming and quickly dived into the snow for safety, but Donald runs for his life. When he gets into a collision with Goofy, they both run for their lives until they get caught in the snowball, and fall on their workplace, completely destroying it. Donald and Goofy are then seen in the cages they brought for the animals they plan to catch, and a can of beans falls into Donald's mouth, making him grumble in anger when the short ends.

Voice cast
 Goofy: Pinto Colvig
 Donald Duck: Clarence Nash

Releases
1938 – theatrical release
c. 1972 – The Mouse Factory, episode #23: "Penguins" (TV)
c. 1983 – Good Morning, Mickey!, episode #48 (TV)
c. 1992 – Donald's Quack Attack, episode #24 (TV)
1997 – The Ink and Paint Club, episode #1.25: "Goofy Goofs Around" (TV)
2011 – Have a Laugh!, episode #18 (TV)

Home media
The short was released on May 18, 2004 on Walt Disney Treasures: The Chronological Donald, Volume One: 1934-1941.

Additional releases include:
1986 – "The Importance of Being Donald" (VHS)
1986 – "Mickey Knows Best/The Importance of Being Donald" (laserdisc)
2007 – "It's a Small World of Fun: Volume 4" (DVD)
2018 – "Olaf's Frozen Adventure" (DVD & Blu-ray)

References

External links

Donald Duck short films
1930s Disney animated short films
1938 films
Films set in Antarctica
Goofy (Disney) short films
1938 animated films
Films directed by Ben Sharpsteen
Films produced by Walt Disney
Animated films about penguins
American black-and-white films
1930s American films